Instant sauces are industrially prepared sauce mixes, typically dehydrated, used to prepare sauces. Instant sauces are typically thickened with thickening agents such as starch.

List of instant sauces
Some popular brands include:
 Asian Home Gourmet
 Bisto
 Knorr
 Lawry's
 Durkee
 French's
 Colman's
 Simply Organic
 Kikkoman
 Lobo
 S&B Foods

Types of sauce available include:
 white
 parsley
 onion
 beef Stroganoff
 garlic and herb
 Béarnaise (thickened with starch rather than egg)
 Alfredo sauce (thickened with starch rather than cheese)
 goulash
 curry
 chili con carne
 pesto
 green peppercorn
 Hollandaise (thickened with starch rather than egg)
 cream
 beef, chicken, turkey gravy

See also

 Instant soup
 Instant custard

Notes

Sauces
Instant foods and drinks
Dried foods